Acanceh Municipality (In the Yucatec Maya Language: “Where the deer moans”) is one of the 106 municipalities in the Mexican state of Yucatán containing  (153.29 km2) of land and located roughly 32 km southeast of the city of Mérida.

History
During the Maya period there were mounds and pyramids here. Various archeological sites exist, like those at Canicab, Poxila and Ekmul.

After the conquest during the colonial period, the Municipality of Acanceh was founded as an encomienda in the second half of the sixteenth century. The most notable of the encomenderos were Francisco de Arceo and the Lady Ana Arguelles. Also during this period, a convent and Church to the Virgin of Guadalupe, and the Church of our Lady of the Nativity, were built in Acanceh.

In the nineteenth century, Acanceh changed jurisdiction numerous times. In 1825, it was part of the municipality of Mama; in 1837, was transferred to the municipality of Mérida; in 1840, it was joined with the municipality of Tecoh; in 1862 it returned to the Mérida Municipality; and finally in 1876, the State Congress granted the status of the village.

In the modern era, Governor Prisciliano Cortés granted Acanceh the rank of city in 1914, but that was revoked by Governor Salvador Alvarado when he declared official acts of the previous administration null and void. In 1918, the organic law of municipalities for the state of Yucatán declared Acanceh as a free municipality. On 20 December 1922, by Decree of the Socialist Governor Felipe Carrillo Puerto, land reform returned the land to the pueblo.

Governance
The municipal president is elected for a three-year term. Nine aldermen also serve on the town council. There is a Secretary, and councilors of Heritage and patrimony; Education and Culture; Public Works; Public Security; Nomenclature; Parks and Public Gardens; Ecology; and Cemeteries.

Communities
The municipality is made up of 6 communities:

Local festivals
Every year from 3 to 7 October Tepich holds the celebration in honor to the Virgin of the Rosary; from 14 to 17 August, in Petectunich they celebrate the Immaculate Conception; and from November 27 to December 12 is the festival of our Lady of Guadalupe.

Tourist attractions
 Acanceh archeological site
 Hacienda Petectunich
 Hacienda Ticopó

External links
 site on Acanceh archeological site

References

Municipalities of Yucatán